Nazareth Academy High School is a private, Roman Catholic, all-girls high school in Philadelphia, Pennsylvania.

Background
Nazareth Academy was established in 1928 by the Sisters of the Holy Family of Nazareth. Nazareth Academy educates young women at the high school level.

In August 2018, the school named its first lay principal, James Meredith.

Performing arts
Nazareth Academy High School has a music department. Over 25% of the school's population participates in the eight music activities Nazareth Academy High School has to offer. For girls interested in pursuing music further, there are Music Major classes which teach music theory, dictation, sight reading and singing skills. There are performance opportunities for girls in the music department, and each year the Orchestra, Jazz Band, and Chorale compete.

There is a theater department that offers a "Theater in the Round" experience. In October 2007, the school's production was The Sound of Music.

Notable alumnae
Maureen Johnson - author
Christina Perri - singer songwriter (Graduated from Archbishop Ryan HS)

Notes and references

External links
 School Website

Roman Catholic secondary schools in Philadelphia
Educational institutions established in 1928
Girls' schools in Pennsylvania
1928 establishments in Pennsylvania
Northeast Philadelphia